Statistics of Primera Fuerza in season 1920-21.

Club España decided to form their own league called "Liga Nacional" playing alongside the official one (Liga Mexicana)

Liga Nacional (Unofficial)

Overview
It was contested by 5 teams, and Club España won the championship. Tournament played at a single leg.

Liga Mexicana (Official)

Overview
It was contested by 15 teams, and Germania won the championship.

References
Mexico - List of final tables (RSSSF)

Primera Fuerza seasons
Mex
1920–21 in Mexican football